The Way Home is a 2002 film written and directed by Lee Jeong-hyang. It tells the heart-warming story about a grandmother and her city-born grandson who comes to live with her in a rural village. The film, which reminds the younger generation of the unconditional love and care that old people selflessly give, won South Korea's equivalent of the Oscars for best picture and screenplay. It was the second-highest grossing homegrown film in South Korea in 2002. It was released on DVD and VHS, with English subtitles, in 2003 by Paramount Classics.

The film is in the List of highest-grossing films in South Korea, with 4,091,000 number of admissions nationwide.

Plot
The story begins on a fine summer's morning, when Sang-woo (Yoo Seung-ho) and his mother board a bus to the country. It is soon clear that the unsophisticated rural passengers annoy the seven-year-old urban boy. His mother is taking him to live with his 78-year-old mute, but not deaf, grandmother (Kim Eul-boon) while she looks for a new job after a business venture failed in Seoul. Eventually they reach their destination, a dusty bus stop in the Korean countryside near an unsophisticated village.
  
By now Sang-woo, who has arrived with junk food and toys, has no intention of respecting his mute grandmother especially as her house has neither electricity nor running water. His mother apologizes for leaving the boy, telling her own mother it will not be for too long before leaving on the next bus. Alone Sang-woo ignores his grandmother, not even wanting to look at her even calling her a byungshin, or "retard". Next morning, his grandmother starts another day. She goes down the hill to get clean water and washes her clothes at the river. She also tends the melons that she will sell at the market.

One of the Grandmother's neighbors is a hard-working country boy who attempts to become friends with Sang-woo, who declines until the end when he apologizes for making fun of him. The other is a young girl who Sang-Woo falls in love with, but she is more interested in the country boy.

The grandmother, who also cares for her old friends very much, lives a simple and humble life. Eventually, from constant play, Sang-woo's Game Boy runs-out of batteries so he asks his grandmother for money for new ones. But she is poor and has none. Selfishly he teases her, and in an intolerant manner throws away her shoes, breaks one of her vases and draws graffiti on her house walls.

When this fails to get money from his grandmother, Sang-woo steals her ornamental hairpin to trade for batteries. He then goes off to find the shops. When he finally finds the right place he attempts to trade the silver hairpin but instead of getting batteries the shop keeper, who happens to be his grandmother's friend, hits him on the head and sends him home.

One day Sang-woo demands Kentucky Fried Chicken. But as the grandmother only understands "chicken", she takes some of her melons and trudges off to the market to buy a chicken. Bringing back a live one in the rain, she prepares a home-made boiled chicken instead of fried chicken. When Sang-woo wakes up he sees the boiled chicken he gets angry, throwing the food away and cries. Later in the night he finishes the food because he is hungry. The next morning, his grandmother becomes ill. Sang-woo serves her the remaining chicken while caring for her. He also gave back his grandmother’s ornamental hairpin.

Despite the hardships faced by the old grandmother who has osteoporosis, the only thing she needs Sang-woo for is to run thread through her needles. She stitches the shoes and shares her earnings with a friend who ends their meeting with the touching words "Come by again before one of us dies."

Sang-woo who remains angry and confused by the unfamiliar environment repeatedly rejects her attempts to please him. But her unconditional love slowly touches his heart. One day, Sang-woo gets up early and goes with his grandmother to the market where he sees how hard his grandmother persuades passers-by to buy her vegetables. After a long day at the market she takes Sang-woo to a shop and buys him noodles and new shoes. When they are about to board the bus home, Sang-woo asks his grandma to buy him a Choco Pie.

The grandmother goes to a shop that is run by an elderly friend. The shopkeeper, who now has a bad knee, gives her five or six pies but refuses to take any money, so the grandmother gives the shopkeeper a melon. But when the grandmother returns to the bus with the sweets, Sang-Woo says he wants to ride alone as the girl he likes is also on board. The grandmother tries to get Sang-Woo to take the rest of the produce with him but he refuses. The bus then leaves. Sang-Woo then has to wait for his grandmother to return wondering why it is taking her so long. He then realizes that his grandmother has walked back from town carrying all her produce.

Eventually Sang-woo begins to love his grandmother, but because she is unable to read or write he makes some simple greeting cards, so she has some letters from him. Finally Sang-woo's mother returns and he goes back to Seoul. His depth of feeling for his grandmother is revealed when the bus leaves and he leaps to the back window to wave his tearful farewells. The film closes with the grandmother continuing to live alone in the thatched-roof house but with the letters of love from her grandson.

Before the end a credit notes the film is dedicated to all grandmothers around the world.

Cast

Principal
Kim Eul-boon as Grandmother
Yoo Seung-ho as Sang-woo

Supporting
Dong Hyo-hee as Sang-woo's mother
Min Kyung-hyun as Cheol-yi, country boy, neighbor of the grandmother
Im Eun-kyung as Hae-yeon

Production
The film was filmed in and around Jeetongma, North Gyeongsang Province, South Korea.

Reception
The film received generally positive reviews from both Western and Korean critics. The review aggregator Rotten Tomatoes reported that 75% of critics gave the film positive reviews, based on 56 reviews. Steven Rea from the Philadelphia Inquirer gave the film 3.5 stars out of 4 saying that "Jeong-Hyang Lee's film is deceptively simple, deeply satisfying."

Many critics praised the style of the movie as well as the acting of the inexperienced Kim Eul-boon who at 78, had not only never acted before, but never even seen a film. The film went on to win the Best Film and Best screenplay awards at the Grand Bell Awards, the Oscar's equivalent in South Korea. It was also nominated for Best Asian Film at the 22nd Hong Kong Film Awards, but lost to My Sassy Girl, another South Korean film.

References

External links

2002 drama films
Films set in the 21st century
CJ Entertainment films
Paramount Vantage films
Best Picture Grand Bell Award winners
South Korean drama films
American drama films
Grand Prize Paeksang Arts Award (Film) winners
2000s South Korean films
2000s American films